Gloom is a 1995 computer game for the Amiga computer. Gloom was the first commercially released Amiga clone of first-person shooter Doom.

Gameplay 

Gloom features 'Messy' or 'Meaty' graphics settings. If 'Messy' graphics are enabled, gibs from enemies explode more violently but disappear promptly, and if 'Meaty' graphics are enabled, all gibs from defeated enemies will remain on the floor where they died until the level is completed. Gloom Deluxe is playable on a workbench screen, a feature absent from its predecessor. Gloom has a two-player mode, and can be played over a network or by using split screen.

History 
Gloom was developed as an Amiga Doom clone by Mark Sibly (programmer) Kurt & Hans Butler (graphics), Laki Schuster (additional artwork) and Kev Stannard (music). A later version of the game, Gloom Deluxe, featured higher resolution graphic modes.

Gloom was followed by Gloom 3. A Gloom 2 was announced but not released.

In January 2017 the assembly and BlitzBasic 2 source code of Gloom was released as public domain software under unlicense on GitHub. The assets were released "for historical and archiving purposes".

Development 
Gloom's map editor and utility programs were written in Blitz BASIC, a programming language written by Mark Sibly, one of the developers of Gloom. Gloom was developed in a year, and development began in May 1994. In a 1995 issue of The One, a British gaming magazine, Gloom was previewed before release with some information about its development. Gloom was also the cover story of this issue, and a demo of Gloom was included on the cover disk. The One's logo is on several walls in Gloom in the demo. Several developers at Black Magic Software were interviewed, including Mark Sibly, Hans and Kurt Butler, who worked on graphics, and Kev Stannard. Mark stated in regards to Gloom's name: "The name sort of started out as a joke ... just something to call the project while we were working on it. By the time we had to settle on a 'real' name, we threw around some petty weird ones like Gorefest '95, and Bloodbath, but wound up sticking with Gloom. Probably because we were all used to it."

The crew behind Gloom met while working on a game together, with Mark describing the situation as "a bit of a drama, to be honest. We'd gone over there to work for this rich guy who wanted to get into the games publishing biz, but things turned pretty ugly at the end. We actually finished the game, but nothing ever came of it." While it is a Doom clone, the development team attempted to differentiate Gloom from its inspiration and other Doom clones by dividing the game into "distinct graphic styles" to "alter the mood of the game entirely." A trait noted by Kurt Butler is that many other Doom clones' sprites "don't really stand out from the background graphics ... I think this is due to the fact that they used colours too dull and similar to the background shades." Gloom's enemy sprites are designed to stand out from the background, which aids the player to see them at a distance.

A key feature of Gloom is that all enemies explode into gibs upon being killed rather than leaving a corpse, and to promote this feature, a competition was run in The One magazine to correctly match up pictured in-game gibs with what body part/organ they are, with the winner's face being put into Gloom.

Gloom was stated to cost £29.99 in 1995.

Reception 

The game was ranked the 18th best game of all time by Amiga Power. The One magazine gave Gloom an overall score of 90%, stating: "The emphasis of the game is on action, and there is plenty of it. ... The only disappointing thing I can think of is that there is a distinct lack of weapons. Only one gun can be carried at a time ... The guns get quite beefy but the ability to carry a massive arsenal and swap between shotguns, bazookas, et al is sadly missing." The One found the gibbing of enemies "immensely satisfying" and referred to Gloom as "bloody brilliant"

CU Amiga gave Gloom an overall score of 90%, praising Gloom's rock soundtrack, and calling its graphics and enemies 'impressive'. CU Amiga expressed that they feel Gloom differentiates itself from Doom, stating that while Doom 'has more atmosphere', Gloom is "more frantic". CU Amiga summarises Gloom's combat as "excellent".

References

External links
Gloom at Hall of Light – The Database of Amiga Games

 - Source code of Gloom released in May 2017
Gloom CD-32 Disk Art on Archive.org

1995 video games
Amiga games
Amiga CD32 games
Multiplayer null modem games
Amiga 1200 games
Video game clones
Commercial video games with freely available source code
Public-domain software with source code
Video games developed in New Zealand
First-person shooters
Video games with 2.5D graphics
Sprite-based first-person shooters
Software using the Unlicense license